The Shuzenji Romney Railway (ロムニー鉄道, Romney Railway) is a 1.2 km,  gauge ridable miniature railway located in Niji-no-Sato (Rainbow Park) in Izu, Shizuoka, on the Izu Peninsula in Japan. It is based on the English Romney, Hythe & Dymchurch Railway on the English Channel coast in Kent, which opened in 1927. The railway operates using a mixture of steam and diesel locomotives and enclosed saloon carriages. Its primary two steam engines were built by the Ravenglass and Eskdale Railway in Cumbria, England, and are based on that line's 1976 Northern Rock 2-6-2 steam locomotive. Its No. 2 locomotive Ernest W. Twining was acquired from the Fairbourne Railway in Wales when that line converted to  gauge. There is also a small 15-inch gauge railway museum.

Locomotives

References

 Hiroshi Naito, "Shuzenji Romney Railway in Niji-no-Sato, Rainbow Country" - Japanese Railway Society

External links

 Niji-no-Sato 
 Niji-no-Sato Romney Railway 

15 in gauge railways in Japan
Ravenglass and Eskdale Railway
Tourist attractions in Shizuoka Prefecture
Rail transport in Shizuoka Prefecture
Heritage railways in Japan
Izu, Shizuoka